Angola competed at the 2004 Summer Olympics in Athens, Greece from 13 to 29 August 2004.

Athletics 

Angolan athletes have so far achieved qualifying standards in the following athletics events (up to a maximum of 3 athletes in each event at the 'A' Standard, and 1 at the 'B' Standard):

Men

Women

Basketball 

Angola has qualified a men's team.

 Men's team event – 1 team of 12 players

Men's tournament

Roster

Group play

Classification round (11th–12th place)

Handball

Women's tournament

Roster

Group play

9th-10th Place Final

Judo

Swimming 

Men

References

External links
Official Report of the XXVIII Olympiad
Angola NOC

Nations at the 2004 Summer Olympics
2004
2004 in Angolan sport